The following lists events that happened during 1984 in Laos.

Incumbents
President: Souphanouvong 
Prime Minister: Kaysone Phomvihane

Events

Deaths
10 January - Souvanna Phouma, Lao prime minister and neutralist leader (b. 1901)

References

 
Years of the 20th century in Laos
Laos
1980s in Laos
Laos